The Michigan Quarter Horse Association Hall of Fame was founded in the late 1980s to honor individuals and horses from the US state of Michigan. The intent of this hall of fame is to recognize those who have made significant contributions to the Association and have impacted the Quarter Horse breed.

References

External links
 Official Site

Halls of fame in Michigan
American Quarter Horse Association
Horse racing museums and halls of fame
Cowboy halls of fame